The Sabzwar dynasty of Mashad was an Iraqi-Iranian dynasty prominent in Indo-Iranian politics, which rose to immense importance in the Mughal Empire. The family shared important marital relationships with several prominent Indian families, especially that of Itimad Ud Daula.

History  
The dynasty descends in the male line from the fourth Rashidun Caliph Ali and was founded by Sayyid Abul Mukhtar Al Naqab, Amir al Hajj. The Shrine of Imam Reza at Mashhad was long associated with this dynasty, and heads of the dynasty held immense prestige in the Safavid Empire.

Amir Shamsuddin Ali II, Naqib al Nuqba (Chief Genealogist) of Khorassan and Iraq came to Najaf from Iraq during the reign of Shah Rukh. He is separated from Amir Ali Shamsuddin Ali Madi by three generations and his son Amir Shamsuddin Ali III became the pre-eminent Noble of Khorasan. Ali III acquired much of the territory of Sabzawar and when Abdullah Khan Uzbeg of Turan overran most of Khorasan, he remained a staunch opponent and gave a harsh reply to Abdullah Khan's overtures. His boldness and independence caught the eye of Shah Tahmasp of Iran who bestowed upon him the title of Sultan and extended his territory.

Later, members of this family received mansabs under the emperor Jahangir and one was appointed Subahdar of Delhi.

References 

Asian dynasties